Lawrence T. Cannon (born April 12, 1947) is an American retired basketball player. Born and raised in Philadelphia, Cannon was selected in the first round of the 1969 NBA draft by the Chicago Bulls with the fifth overall pick. Cannon was an American Basketball Association All-Star, who averaged 16.6 points per game in his ABA/NBA career after his All-American career at LaSalle College. Cannon was forced to retire from basketball due to a chronic medical condition, phlebitis in his legs.

High school career
A 6'5" (1.93 m) guard, Cannon was born and raised in Philadelphia.

At Abraham Lincoln High School in Philadelphia, Cannon set scoring records that still stand. Cannon scored more total points all-time than any Philadelphia high school player except Wilt Chamberlain. In 1965 Cannon shot 21-for-47 to score 49 points, 34 in the second half, to set a Public League and city-leagues postseason record as Lincoln defeated Roxborough High School 84–78.

Cannon was a high school Parade All-American.

Collegiate career
La Salle College finished 23–1 in 1968–1969, as Cannon led the team with 140 assists and was second in rebounds (147). Cannon averaged 19.1 points per game during his three seasons, accumulating a total of 1,430 points, and was named to All-American teams.

As a sophomore in 1966–1967, Cannon averaged 18.7 points, 10.3 rebounds and 3.0 assists as LaSalle finished 14–12 under Coach Joseph Heyer.

LaSalle finished 20–8 under Coach Jim Hardin in 1967–1968, as Cannon averaged 19.5 points, 9.9 rebounds and 4.8 assists in his junior year.

Under Coach Tom Gola in his senior year, Cannon averaged 19.0 points, 6.4 rebounds and 6.1 assists and received second-team All-America recognition. La Salle was not permitted to enter the NCAA basketball tournament in Cannon's senior year, despite being ranked #2 in the nation behind UCLA, due to recruiting violations by the school. Over his final two seasons LaSalle was 43–9, with a 15–0 record in the  Middle Atlantic Conference.

In 75 career games at LaSalle, Cannon averaged 19.1 points, 9.0 rebounds and 4.6 assists, with 1430 total points.

Professional career
Cannon was selected by the Chicago Bulls in the 1st round (5th pick overall) of the 1969 NBA draft and by the Miami Floridians in the American Basketball Association (ABA) 1969 ABA draft. Cannon chose to play in the ABA.

As a rookie in 1969–1970, Cannon averaged 11.8 points, 2.5 rebounds and 2.7 assists with the Floridians, who finished 23–61 under coaches Jim Pollard (5–15) and Harold Blitman (18–46).

Cannon lead the Denver Rockets (ABA) with 26.6 points per game during the 1970–1971 season.

In 1970–1971, playing for Joe Belmont (3–10) and Stan Albeck (27–44), Cannon played in 80 games, averaging 26.6 points, 4.2 rebounds and 5.6 assists. He made the All-ABA Second team. The 1st Team was: Rick Barry, Roger Brown, Mack Calvin, Mel Daniels and Charlie Scott. The 2nd Team was Zelmo Beaty, John Brisker, Joe Caldwell, Cannon, Donnie Freeman and Dan Issel. It was the only full and healthy season of Cannon's professional career.

In 1971–1972, Cannon played for the Indiana Pacers, averaging 6.6 points, 2.6 assists and 1.7 rebounds, as the Pacers defeated the New York Nets with Rick Barry 4–2 in the ABA Finals to capture the ABA Championship.

In his career, Cannon played for the Miami Floridians (1969–70), Denver Rockets (1970–71), Memphis Pros (1971–72), Indiana Pacers (1971–72, 1973–74) in the ABA for 194 games and Philadelphia 76ers (1973–74) in the NBA for 19 games. Overall, in his ABA/NBA career, Cannon averaged 16.6 points, 2.9 rebounds and 3.6 assists in 213 career games.

Cannon was forced to retire due to a chronic medical condition, phlebitis in his legs.

Honors
 Cannon was elected to the Middle Atlantic Conference Hall of Fame in 2018.
 In 1973 Cannon was elected to the Big 5 Hall of Fame. He was in the inaugural class along with Cliff Anderson (St. Josephs), Wali Jones (Villanova), Stan Pawlak (Pennsylvania), and Guy Rodgers (Temple).
 Cannon was inducted into the "Pennsylvania Basketball Hall of Fame."
 Cannon was inducted into the La Salle Hall of Athletes in 1977.
 In 2010, Cannon was recognized as an Atlantic 10 Conference Legend.
 Cannon's # 20 jersey was retired by LaSalle in December, 2016.
 In 2016, La Salle's 1968–69 basketball team was enshrined in the Big 5 Hall of Fame.
 In 2019, La Salle's 1968–69 basketball team was inducted into the La Salle Hall of Athletes.

References

External links

1947 births
Living people
American men's basketball players
Basketball coaches from Pennsylvania
Basketball players from Philadelphia
Chicago Bulls draft picks
Continental Basketball Association coaches
Denver Rockets players
Indiana Pacers players
Lancaster Red Roses (CBA) players
La Salle Explorers men's basketball players
Memphis Pros players
Miami Floridians draft picks
Miami Floridians players
Parade High School All-Americans (boys' basketball)
Philadelphia 76ers players
Shooting guards